Theodoros Margellos (Greek: Θεόδωρος Μαργέλλος; 1953– 1 March 2021) was a Greek businessman. He was the only Greek sanctioned by Russia in May 2015 during the Russo-Ukrainian War.

Biography

Theodors Margellos was born in 1953.

He graduated from the University of Lausanne in 1975.

Margellos was part of the IJ Partners firm, which manages private funds in Switzerland.

In 1989, he was involved in a corn scandal of Greekization of Yugoslavia, but was later acquitted by a panel.

In 2011, Panos Kammenos, a member of parliament for New Democracy at the time, had mentioned his name in the case of the CDs of the Postal Savings Bank, which he had categorically denied, while last year, according to the newspaper, "To Paron"  they claimed him to be his financier party The River.

In May 2015, Margellos was sanctioned by Russia during the Russo-Ukrainian War.

He died on 1 March 2021 at the age of 68.

References

1953 births
2021 deaths
Greek businesspeople